The 2023 Atlanta United 2 season is the team's sixth year of existence as well as their first season in MLS Next Pro, the third tier of the American soccer pyramid.

Club

Player movement

In

Out

Competitions

MLS Next Pro

League table

Results summary

Matches

Statistics

Top Scorers

Appearances and goals

References

Atlanta United 2 seasons
Atlanta United 2
Atlanta United 2